Newcastle High School for Girls is a private day school for girls aged 3–18 in Newcastle upon Tyne, England. The Junior School is at Sandyford Park and the Senior School is located in the neighbouring suburb of Jesmond.

The school was formed in September 2014 by the merger of Central Newcastle High School and Newcastle upon Tyne Church High School. It is operated by the Girls' Day School Trust, an organisation which ran one of the predecessor schools, Central Newcastle High, pre-merger.

History
Newcastle High School for Girls was formed by the merger of the predecessor single-sex girls' schools, Church High School and Central Newcastle High School, which had good records of academic performance.

Central Newcastle High School GDST dates back to 1876 when the Girls' Public Day School Trust founded Gateshead High School. The School moved to Newcastle in 1895, and was renamed to Central Newcastle High School.

In 1884, The Church Schools' Company decided to open a private girls' school in the North East which focused on a church-based learning environment. A high school for girls in Newcastle was established in 1885 and opened with 59 pupils. A new association was formed in 1925, and the school was renamed The Newcastle upon Tyne Church High School.

In 2014 the schools merged to form 2016, the school moved to new facilities on Tankerville Terrace which incorporated the former Church High building and a new purpose-built 3625-square-metre, three-storey block.

The established Headmistress responsible for the move to the new facilities, Hilary French was dismissed from her post on the 16th of June 2018 following an investigation into her conduct where it was alleged that she had made dishonest expenses claims.  She was arrested by Northumbria Police on the 20th of June 2018, interviewed and released pending further enquiries. In February 2019 a Northumbria Police spokesperson said that there was no update on the investigation into Hilary French. She was succeeded by Michael Tippet.

Curriculum
Newcastle High School for Girls has a strong academic record, regularly ranking in the top 5 independent schools in North East England and top 100 nationally.

The Prime Minister's Global Fellowship
Two Central Newcastle High School students attainined places on the Prime Minister's Global Fellowship programme. The school achieved its first student in the inaugural year of the programme, 2008, and in 2009 had another successful applicant.

Notable former pupils

 Dame Irene Ward, (1895–1980), British politician (educated at Newcastle upon Tyne Church High School)
 Verena Winifred Holmes, engineer
Ursula Dronke (1920–2012), Medievalist and Professor of Old Norse Studies (educated at Newcastle upon Tyne Church High School)
Andrea Riseborough (born 1981), actress (educated at Newcastle upon Tyne Church High School)
Lucy Akhurst (born 1975), actress, writer and director (educated at Newcastle upon Tyne Church High School)
Ruth Caleb  (born 1942), film and television producer (educated at Newcastle upon Tyne Church High School)
Dr Barbara C. Morden, author and cultural historian (educated at Newcastle upon Tyne Church High School)
Esther McCracken (1902–1971), playwright and actress
Miriam Stoppard (born 1937), doctor and author
Professor Ruth Plummer, Professor of Experimental Cancer Medicine (educated at Newcastle upon Tyne Central High School)
 L Devine, Singer

References

Other sources
A.C. and F.M., The Newcastle upon Tyne Church High School Jubilee History 1885-1935, Andrew Reid & Company Limited, 1935.
Helen G. Scott & Elizabeth A. Wise, The Centenary Book of the Newcastle upon Tyne Church High School 1885-1985, 1985.
Carter, Oliver; Girls' Public Day School Trust (1955). History of Gateshead High School 1876–1907 and Central Newcastle High School 1895–1955. G.F. Laybourne.
 2007 ISI Inspection Report

External links
 School website
Newcastle Church High School Heritage website
 Profile on GDST website
 Profile on Girls' Schools Association website

Girls' schools in Tyne and Wear
Educational institutions established in 1895
Schools of the Girls' Day School Trust
Member schools of the Girls' Schools Association
Private schools in Newcastle upon Tyne
1895 establishments in England